Bangaru Babu ( Golden Boy)  is 2009 Andhra Telugu-language drama film, produced by K.Ramakrishna Prasad on Swobhagya Media Limited banner, story & screenplay by Dasari Narayana Rao and directed by Jonnalagadda Srinivas. Starring Jagapathi Babu, Meera Jasmine and music composed by M. M. Srilekha. The film was recorded as flop at the box office. Most of the scenes in the film have been shot extensively in Jammu & Kashmir. The movie was a remake of the Kannada movie Rishi (2005).

Plot

Cast

 Jagapathi Babu as Ravindra
 Meera Jasmine as Meera
 Sayaji Shinde as Narsimha Rao
 Sonu Sood as Rajendra, Ravindra's brother
 Murali Mohan as Ravindra's father
 Jayasudha as Ravindra's mother
 Shashank as Hari
 Gowri Munjal
 Jaya Prakash Reddy 
 Dharmavarapu Subramanyam as Murthy
 M. S. Narayana as Nagaraju
 L. B. Sriram 
 Amith
 Raja Sridhar
 Ping Pong Surya
 Kondavalasa
 Chittajalu Lakshmipati
 Vizag Prasad
 Shankar Melkote
 Malladi Raghava
 Narayana Rao
 Navabharat Balaji
 Gundu Sudarshan
 Ambati Srinivas
 Fish Venkat as Narsimha Rao's henchmen 
 Uttej
 Jenny
 Jyothi Lakshmi
 Sudha
 Hema as Ravindra's sister
 Sudeepa Pinky
 Rama Prabha
 Vinaya Prasad
 Jhansi
 Padma Jayanth
 Srilalitha
 Monica Chowdary

Soundtrack

Music composed by M. M. Srilekha. Music released on Mayuri Audio Company.

References

2009 films
2000s Telugu-language films
Telugu remakes of Kannada films
Indian romantic drama films
2009 romantic drama films